The Carnegie Mellon School of Drama is the first degree-granting drama institution in the United States. Founded in 1914, it is one of five schools within the Carnegie Mellon College of Fine Arts.

The school's undergraduate BFA programs in acting, musical theatre, directing, design, dramaturgy, and production technology and management majors are considered to be among the top programs in undergraduate conservatory training. Its MFA offerings in directing, design, dramatic writing, and production and technology management are also considered to be top graduate programs. The School of Drama offers 18 events every season on campus, and also presents members of its graduating class in produced showcases in New York City and Los Angeles. Many Carnegie Mellon graduates have also gone on to successful careers in Pittsburgh theatre.

The 2017, The Hollywood Reporter best undergraduate drama schools ranked Carnegie Mellon second. In 2014, The Hollywood Reporter ranked the School of Drama number three in the world among drama schools. In 2015, the same publication ranked the MFA program at the School of Drama number five in the world. According to Playbill, the Carnegie Mellon School of Drama ranks fourth in the number of alumni represented in the 2015–2016 Broadway season.

Facilities

Since 2000, the Purnell Center for the Arts, specifically designed for the School of Drama, has been the department's home. The space includes:
Philip Chosky Theater, a 430-seat proscenium theater
Helen Wayne Rauh Studio Theater, a 140-seat black box theater
John Wells Video Studio, a sound stage television studio
As well as two movement/dance studios, three rehearsal studios, four design studios, a lighting lab, a sound lab, a costume shop, a scene shop, and various classrooms.

Notable alumni

René Auberjonois, actor (Star Trek: Deep Space 9)
Habib Azar, director, filmmaker 
Hale Appleman, actor (The Magicians)
Felecia M. Bell, actress
Natalie Venetia Belcon, actress
Denée Benton, actress (Natasha, Pierre & The Great Comet of 1812)
Carl Betz, actor (The Donna Reed Show)
Steven Bochco, Emmy Award-winning writer/producer/director (Hill Street Blues, L.A. Law and NYPD Blue)
Matthew Bomer, actor (Magic Mike, Chuck, White Collar)
Abby Brammell, actress
Jack Carpenter, actor
Anthony Carrigan, actor (Barry)
Donna Lynne Champlin, actress
Gaius Charles, actor (Friday Night Lights, Grey's Anatomy)
Casey Childs, actor, artistic director, Founder of Primary Stages.
Corey Cott, actor (Newsies, Gigi, Bandstand)
Casey Cott, actor (Kevin Keller on Riverdale)
Christina Crawford, author (Mommie Dearest)
James Cromwell, actor (All In The Family, Babe, The Queen) 
Ted Danson, actor (Cheers, Damages)
Neal Dodson, film producer (Margin Call, All Is Lost, and A Most Violent Year)
Dagmara Dominczyk, actress (The Count of Monte Cristo)
Barbara Feldon, actress
Katie Finneran, actress (Noises Off, Promises, Promises (musical)) (attended briefly)
Sutton Foster, actress (Thoroughly Modern Millie, The Drowsy Chaperone, "Anything Goes") (attended briefly)
Christian Borle, actor (Smash, Spamalot, Legally Blonde, Peter and the Starcatcher)
Josh Gad, actor (Frozen, The Book of Mormon)
Renée Elise Goldsberry, Tony Award-winning actress (Hamilton)
Frank Gorshin, actor/comedian
Josh Groban, singer (attended briefly)
Van Hansis, actor (As the World Turns)
Ian Harding, actor (Pretty Little Liars)
Mariette Hartley, actress 
Ethan Hawke, actor (attended briefly)
Sian Heder, writer and Academy Award-winning filmmaker (Orange Is The New Black,  Tallulah, CODA)
Megan Hilty, actress/singer (Wicked) (9 to 5)
Holly Hunter, Academy Award-winning actress
Erik Jensen, actor/playwright
Cherry Jones, Tony Award-winning actress
Rachel Keller, actress on "Fargo" and "Legion" TV series
Arthur Kennedy, actor
Dennis Kenney, actor/singer
Frederick Koehler, actor (Kate & Allie, Oz)
Jack Klugman, actor
Andrew Kober, actor
Eugene Lee, scenic designer (Saturday Night Live)
Telly Leung, actor (Glee, In Transit, Allegiance)
Judith Light, actress
Kara Lindsay, actress (Newsies, Wicked)
Sara Lindsey, actress
Kristolyn Lloyd, actress (Dear Evan Hansen, The Bold and the Beautiful)
Michael McMillian, actor (Dorian Blues, True Blood)
Gabriel Macht, actor
Joe Manganiello, actor (Magic Mike, True Blood)
Sonia Manzano, actress (Sesame Street)
Nancy Marchand, actress (Lou Grant, The Sopranos) 
Rob Marshall, film director, nominated for a 2003 Academy Award for Chicago.
Rebecca Metz, actor, (Better Things (TV series), Coop and Cami Ask the World, Shameless (U.S. TV series))
Patina Miller, Tony Award-winning actress (Pippin)
Katy Mixon, actress (Mike & Molly, American Housewife)
Ming-Na Wen, actress (The Joy Luck Club, Mulan, ER, Marvel's Agents of S.H.I.E.L.D.)
Leslie Odom Jr., Tony Award-winning actor (Hamilton)
Rory O'Malley, Tony Award-nominated actor (The Book of Mormon)
Cote de Pablo, actress (NCIS)
Stephanie Palmer, Director of Creative Affairs at MGM, Founder of Good in a Room
John Pasquin, film director
Victoria Pedretti, actress (The Haunting of Hill House, You, The Haunting of Bly Manor)
George Peppard, actor
David Pevsner, actor
Billy Porter, actor/singer
Zachary Quinto, Emmy Award nominated actor (Star Trek, Heroes, 24)
Darren Ritchie, actor
George A. Romero, film director
Ben Levi Ross, actor (Tick Tick Boom)
Ann Roth, costume designer (The English Patient, The Talented Mr. Ripley)
Laura San Giacomo, actress
Pablo Schreiber, Tony Award and Emmy Award nominated actor (Orange is the New Black, American Gods, Thirteen Hours)
Maïté Schwartz, actor (quarterlife)
Stephen Schwartz, film and theatre composer
Leigh Silverman, director
Emily Skinner, actress/singer
Josef Sommer, actor
Aaron Staton, actor (Mad Men)
Patricia Tallman, actress/stuntwoman (Babylon 5)
John-Michael Tebelak, playwright and director (Godspell)
Sada Thompson, actress (Family, The Effect of Gamma Rays on Man-in-the-Moon Marigolds)
Tamara Tunie, actress (Law & Order: Special Victims Unit, As the World Turns)
Blair Underwood, actor
Roberta Valderrama, actress (10 Items or Less, ER)
Paula Wagner, producer (Cruise/Wagner Productions)
John Wells, executive producer/creator (The West Wing, ER)
Maura West, actress (As the World Turns)
Patrick Wilson, actor (Angels in America, Little Children, Watchmen)
Krista Marie Yu, actress (Dr. Ken, Last Man Standing)

See also
Theatre in Pittsburgh

References

External links
Carnegie Mellon School of Drama
Carnegie Mellon School of Drama Showcase
Carnegie Mellon University
West Coast Drama Alumni Clan
New York Drama Alumni Clan
"Third Coast" Chicago Drama Alumni Clan
The Official Unofficial Carnegie Mellon University School of Drama

Schools and departments of Carnegie Mellon
Drama schools in the United States
Performing arts in Pittsburgh
Educational institutions established in 1914
Theatre in Pennsylvania
1914 establishments in Pennsylvania